Keating ministry may refer to:

 First Keating ministry
 Second Keating ministry